Sadiq Mahmud Khurram (born 8 January 1973) is a Pakistani jurist who has been Justice of the Lahore High Court since 23 October 2018.

Career
Khurram was inducted into Lahore High Court (LHC) as an additional justice on 23 October 2018. He became permanent Justice of the LHC on 18 October 2019.

References

1973 births
Living people
Judges of the Lahore High Court
Pakistani judges
Place of birth missing (living people)